The Islington area of North London, England, has been represented in the House of Commons of the Parliament of the United Kingdom through several parliamentary constituencies:

See also 
 List of parliamentary constituencies in London

Islington